Marsupilami is an animated series based on the original Marsupilami comics created by André Franquin. It was produced by Marathon Media and later, Samka Productions. Its first season was simply known as Marsupilami, however the series has been renamed multiple times throughout its run.

Season 1 (2000)
The first season of Marsupilami premiered on March 18, 2000, on Canal J. Produced by Cactus Animation, Marathon Production and Marsu Productions. Marathon's series is far more faithful to the original Marsupilami comic series than the previous Marsupilami animated works made by Disney (featured in the 1992 series Disney's Raw Toonage and its spin-off).

In this first season, Marsupilami went on adventures alone or with his family (his wife Marsupilamie and their three young, Bibi, Bibu and Bobo). For example, in one episode he saved a group of circus animals, got them back to the city and saved the circus from closing. In another, he had to go to the city again to save one of his young, captured by their constant enemy, the hunter Bring M. Backalive.

Season 2 - Mon ami Marsupilami (2003)
In the second season, called Mon ami Marsupilami (translated as My friend Marsupilami), Marsupilami and his family become best friends with a human family, the Du Jardin, that comes to live near them. Amanda is a Marsupilami researcher, while her husband Jean-Pierre is a computer technician that works from home and they have two children, Teo and Zoe. Teo and Marsupilami become best friends and they have lots of adventures, with both new friends and old enemies, like Backalive.

Seasons 3-4 - Houba Houba Hop! (2009-2011)
The third two seasons features a preteen boy named Hector and his aunt Diane, who are going to live in the jungle for one year to study its fauna and flora. They become the best friends with the Marsupilami family. Their main enemies are megalomaniac industrialist and jungle-hater Felicia Devort, who plans to level out the Palombian jungle and build the Devort City megalopolis in its place, and her two henchmen,  and Blouprint.

Season 5 - Nos voisins les Marsupilamis (2012)
The fifth and final season, translated to Our Neighbors the Marsupilamis, featured the Marsupilami family living with veterinarian Bernard Vanderstadt and his four children Sarah, Iris, Isidore and Zoe. Their mother, Caroline, frequently contacts them by phone, but appears in the last three episodes. Once again, Backalive makes an appearance.

References

External links 
 

French-language television shows
Marsupilami
2000s French animated television series
2010s French animated television series
2000 French television series debuts
2012 French television series endings